Róbert Lantoši (born 24 September 1995) is a Slovak professional ice hockey forward who is currently playing for Mladá Boleslav in the Czech Extraliga.

Playing career
Lantoši played as a youth with MsHK Žilina before continuing his junior career in Sweden within the developmental system of VIK Västerås HK. He made his professional debut in the HockeyAllsvenskan during the 2013–14 season, scoring a goal in just one game with VIK.

On 1 July 2017, Lantoši opted to return to his native Slovakia, securing a contract with HC Nové Zámky of the Tipsport liga. During the 2017–18 season, after registering 11 points in 38 games, Lantoši was traded to HK Nitra on 14 January 2018.

After parts of two seasons with Nitra, Lantoši left as a free agent, opting to pursue a career in North America. He signed a one-year AHL contract with the Providence Bruins on July 8, 2019. In his debut North American season in 2019–20, Lantoši was productive offensively, collecting 11 goals and 31 points in 50 regular season games before the season was prematurely ended due to the COVID-19 pandemic.

As a free agent, Lantoši was signed by Providence's NHL affiliate, the Boston Bruins, agreeing to a one-year, entry-level contract on 6 August 2020. On 10 August 2020, Lantoši agreed to return to former Slovak club HK Nitra on loan until the commencement of the delayed 2020–21 North American season.

After two seasons with the Providence Bruins and as an impending restricted free agent from the Boston Bruins, Lantoši opted to return to Europe by agreeing to a one-year contract with Swedish club, Rögle BK of the SHL, on 23 July 2021. In the following 2021–22 season, Lantoši made just 6 appearances with Rögle, before leaving the club for an increased role with fellow SHL club, Linköping HC, on 11 October 2021.

International play

On 11 November 2018, Lantoši made his senior national team debut in Deutschland Cup match against Germany. He was selected to make his full IIHF international debut, participating for Slovakia in the 2019 IIHF World Championship.

Career statistics

Regular season and playoffs

International

References

External links
 

1995 births
Living people
Linköping HC players
HK Nitra players
HC Nové Zámky players
Providence Bruins players
Rögle BK players
IF Sundsvall Hockey players
HC Vita Hästen players
VIK Västerås HK players
Slovak ice hockey forwards
People from Prievidza
Sportspeople from the Trenčín Region
Slovak expatriate ice hockey players in Sweden
Slovak expatriate ice hockey players in the United States
Slovak expatriate ice hockey players in the Czech Republic